Sébastien Olivier Buemi (born 31 October 1988) is a Swiss professional racing driver, who competes in the FIA Formula E Championship for Envision Racing. He competed for Scuderia Toro Rosso in Formula One from 2009 to 2011. After leaving Formula One, Buemi became a reserve driver for Scuderia Toro Rosso's sister team, Red Bull Racing from 2012 to 2013. He returned to Red Bull Racing in 2019 as a reserve driver.

Buemi has competed in the FIA World Endurance Championship with Toyota Gazoo Racing (formerly Toyota Racing) since 2012. He became the 2014 World Endurance Champion in the LMP1 class. He won both the 2018 24 Hours of Le Mans and, subsequently, the 2018-19 WEC Championship. He also won the 2019, 2020 and 2022  24 Hours of Le Mans.

Buemi has raced FIA Formula E Championship with e.dams Renault (now Nissan e.dams) since 2014. He won the Formula E Championship in 2015-16. Buemi also became part of the Nismo Global Driver Exchange.

Early career

Formula BMW 
Born in Aigle, Vaud, Buemi graduated from karting and spent 2004 and 2005 in German Formula BMW, finishing third and second in the championship respectively. He was also runner up in the 2005 FBMW World Final.

Formula Three 
Following a single race in Spanish Formula Three in 2005, Buemi moved up to the Formula Three Euroseries for 2006, finishing 12th in the championship, ceding 11th place to Charlie Kimball on countback. He remained in the series for 2007, and finished second in the championship, behind Romain Grosjean. He has also competed in the special Masters of Formula 3 and Macau Grand Prix races.

A1 Grand Prix 
For the 2006–07 A1 Grand Prix season, Buemi shared driving duties for A1 Team Switzerland with Neel Jani and Marcel Fässler. The team finished eighth in the championship.

GP2 Series 

Buemi was drafted in at short notice to replace the injured Michael Ammermüller at ART Grand Prix for the Monaco round of the 2007 GP2 Series season. He performed creditably on his GP2 début, qualifying fourth and finishing seventh. He joined the Arden International team for the 2008 GP2 Asia Series, and finished as runner-up with a win and four second places. He continued with the team for the main 2008 season. He scored his first win in the French sprint race, starting 21st on the grid (after a technical problem in the feature race) on slick tyres on a drying track and benefitting as most rivals had to pit for slicks.  He won one more race and ended the season sixth in the championship.

Formula One  
On 18 September 2007 he drove the Red Bull RB3 at the F1 test session in Jerez. He was third quickest on the day, behind Timo Glock (BMW) and Vitantonio Liuzzi (Scuderia Toro Rosso) but ahead of names such as Rubens Barrichello (Honda) and Nelson Piquet Jr. (Renault). On 16 January 2008 Red Bull Racing confirmed Buemi as their test and reserve driver for the 2008 season. At the 2008 Japanese Grand Prix, Buemi drove the medical car as usual driver Dr Jacques Tropenat had been suffering from an ear problem. Buemi also drove the medical car at the Chinese Grand Prix and Brazilian Grand Prix.

Scuderia Toro Rosso (2009–2011)

2009 

Scuderia Toro Rosso confirmed its signing of Buemi as one of its race drivers on 9 January 2009. He was the first Swiss driver to take part in an F1 race since Jean-Denis Délétraz drove for Pacific at the 1995 European Grand Prix.

In his first race, the 2009 Australian Grand Prix, Buemi outqualified his teammate Sébastien Bourdais and then scored a point in the race by finishing in eighth position. He was later promoted to seventh place as a result of Lewis Hamilton being disqualified. At the Chinese Grand Prix, he scored another point, this time in the wet, finishing eighth after starting tenth. After a mid season dip in the Toro Rosso's form, Buemi rounded off a good weekend to finish 7th in the 2009 Brazilian Grand Prix. He followed this with a third top ten qualification in a row and another points finish at the season finale in Abu Dhabi. Buemi finished the year sixteenth with 6 points as the best rookie.

2010 

On 9 November 2009, it was confirmed that Buemi would race for a second season with Toro Rosso.

During the first free practice session of the 2010 Chinese Grand Prix, a front suspension wishbone broke under braking on Buemi's Toro Rosso as he braked for Turn 14. One wheel went over the safety fence and landed in a spectator area, missing a camera man on its way. Buemi's car continued to travel forward, veering to the left and sliding along an Armco barrier, knocking off the front wing. Neither Buemi nor any spectators were injured as a result of the incident. Toro Rosso blamed a failure of a new front right upright for the incident. Buemi completed 2010 with eight points to teammate Alguersuari's five. He was sixteenth again in the drivers' championship.

2011 

Buemi, along with his teammate from 2009 and 2010 – Jaime Alguersuari, continued to race for Scuderia Toro Rosso in 2011.
On 14 December 2011 it was announced that both Buemi and Alguersuari had been dropped by the team, and would be replaced by Daniel Ricciardo and Jean-Éric Vergne for the  season.

Red Bull Racing (2012–present)

2012 
In January 2012 it was announced that Buemi would rejoin Red Bull Racing as a test and reserve driver for the  season, as well as acting as Toro Rosso's reserve driver.
Buemi was again announced as reserve driver for 2019 for Red Bull Racing. He participated in the 2020 Young Driver's Test with the Milton Keynes squad. As of 2023, Buemi is one of the reserve drivers for Red Bull.

FIA World Endurance Championship 

Buemi also signed a deal to contest the 24 Hours of Le Mans with Toyota Motorsport GmbH, driving a Toyota TS030 Hybrid with Anthony Davidson and Hiroaki Ishiura (who later withdrew and was replaced by Stéphane Sarrazin). After a strong performance, the car was running in third position in the early evening when Davidson collided with a GT Ferrari and crashed heavily.

In 2013, Buemi continued driving with Toyota for a full season and ended with third place in the drivers' championship. For the 2014 season, he drove Toyota's new car – the Toyota TS040 Hybrid. With four wins and seven podiums from the eight races, Buemi became World Endurance Drivers' Champion with teammate Anthony Davidson.

As of 2022, Buemi has won the FIA WEC three times and won the 24 Hours of Le Mans four times.

Formula E 
Buemi is currently one of the most successful drivers in the series' history having claimed many wins, poles, fastest laps and points in the series.

Renault e.dams (2014–2018) 
Buemi raced in the inaugural Formula E season for e.dams alongside Frenchman Nicolas Prost.

2014–15 season 
Buemi's season did not start off easily with a retirement in Beijing having started from last on the grid and being unable to set a qualifying time at the following round in Putrajaya, he lined up 19th on the grid. Buemi drove a brilliant recovery race having started in 19th and finishing 3rd on the podium ahead of his teammate who started in 11th. At the third round of the season Buemi secured his first race victory in Punta del Este. Buemi started on pole at the following round in Buenos Aires for the first time in his career but crashed out of the race after leading. Buemi went on to win in Monaco and the first London race, both from pole position, whereas he finished second in Berlin.  Buemi finished the season second in the championship, one point short of Nelson Piquet Jr.'s tally.

2015–16 season 

In season two, Buemi dominated the early stages of the championship.  In the season opening round in Beijing Buemi secured pole, fastest lap and the race win.  The story was looking much the same in the following round in Putrajaya before Buemi's car experienced mechanical failure while leading the race.  Having made a mistake in qualifying in Punta del Este, Buemi lined up fifth on the grid, but went on to claim his third fastest lap in three races and another race victory. Next he finished second in Buenos Aires and Mexico.

After a third-place finish at Paris, Buemi scored his third win of the season at Berlin, setting up a nail bitting finale in London. With Buemi needing to finish ahead of rival Lucas di Grassi to win the championship in the second race of the weekend, he was hit off by no other than Di Grassi himself at the first corner. Therefore, the title was to be headed to whoever could get the fastest lap bonus points in their second car. Despite the immense pressure, Buemi cruised to the fastest lap to become Formula E champion 2015-16.

2016–17 season 
Season three started exceptionally well for Buemi, as he won the first three rounds of the championship, becoming the first Formula E driver to achieve the feat of three consecutive wins. Buemi would go on to take three more wins at Monaco, Paris, and Berlin before the final 4 races in New York City and Montreal, both double headers.

However, Buemi skipped the New York event due to his WEC commitments with Toyota and participated in the 6 Hours of Nürburgring instead, with Red Bull F1 test and reserve driver Pierre Gasly taking his place. In addition, he was disqualified from two races for technical infringements. Ultimately, this loss of points led to Buemi missing out on the championship as rival Lucas di Grassi took the title at the final race.

2017–18 season 

Buemi endured a tough start to the season, taking only one point from the opening double-header at Hong Kong, having been involved in some incidents, including with previous seasons' title rival Lucas di Grassi. Buemi hit back with pole position at Marrakesh. He led the race throughout, until 4 laps from the end, he was passed by the Mahindra of Felix Rosenqvist. He achieved two podium finishes at the next two races, to leave him in 4th place in the standings. However, he crashed out of the following race in Punta del Este. His Renault e.dams, however, proved not to be as competitive as previous seasons, and while consistently scoring in the points, he did not achieve a race win or podium for the next 4 races. In the final ePrix of the season, a double-header at New York, Buemi qualified on pole in both rounds, with the final round being achieved in the first wet qualifying session in Formula E history. However, he would slip behind faster cars in the races to 3rd and 4th respectively. This meant he finished the season in 4th place, his lowest position in the standings since Formula E began, with 125 points. Renault e.dams finished the season 5th in the standings, the first time they had not won the Teams' Championship, with Buemi scoring 125 out of the team's 133 points.

Nissan e.dams (2018–2022) 
It was announced that the DAMS would switch from Renault to Nissan from the 2018-19 season. Buemi was initially meant to partner Alexander Albon, who raced for the DAMS Formula 2 team, but he was released by DAMS to join Buemi's former team, Toro Rosso to race in F1 in 2019. Albon was replaced by Oliver Rowland, who had previously raced for DAMS in Formula 2 in 2017.

2018–19 season 
Buemi started the season with 3rd place on the grid, but slipped to 6th by the end of the race. At the next round in Marrakesh, Buemi again started 3rd on the grid, but had to avoid the spinning Techeetah of Jean-Éric Vergne and fell down the order. However, by the end of the race, he recovered to 8th place. At the next race, in Santiago, he inherited pole position when Lucas di Grassi was disqualified for a technical infringement. However, he crashed out of lead towards the end of the race due to a brake failure. Buemi's misfortune continued, when at the next race, both he and his teammate Rowland ran out of energy a lap before the end of the race, running in 4th and 3rd respectively, after Nissan had miscalculated the number of laps remaining. This was followed by a suspension failure causing him to retire from the following round. At the next round he crashed during his superpole run and therefore qualified 6th, but he was later disqualified for a technical infringement and had to start from the pit lane. By the last lap, he had made his way up to 8th place, but while attempting to overtake Robin Frijns, Buemi ploughed into the back of him, causing Frijns to take out di Grassi, moving Buemi up to 6th, while di Grassi retired on the spot, and Frijns limped back home in 14th. Buemi was given a 10-second time penalty for causing the collision and was classified 8th, the position he was in before the crash. He also had trouble in Rome and Paris. However, after taking pole for the Berlin ePrix, his results improved. He finished second, after di Grassi overtook him and won the race. In Bern, and in Race 2 in New York, he finished third. His first victory of the season came in Race 1 in New York, after taking pole position. He was under attack from Jaguar driver Alex Lynn. However, the Brit retired due to a loss of power. After that, Buemi held a comfortable margin to win the race over Lynn’s teammate, Mitch Evans, who had an incredible comeback from 13th position on the grid. By the end of the season, Buemi had overtaken 11 drivers, including title contenders Evans and di Grassi, to climb from 13th to 2nd in the championship.

2019–20 season 
Buemi and Oliver Rowland were retained by Nissan e.dams for the 2019–20 season. Buemi finished fourth in the championship standings.

2020–21 season 
Nissan e.dams retained Buemi and Oliver Rowland for the 2020–21 season.

2021–22 season 
Buemi continued with Nissan e.dams with Maximilian Günther as his new teammate in 2022. The season once again failed to yield any podiums for Buemi, who scored a best result of fifth in New York City, which put him 15th in the standings.

Envision Racing (2023–) 
In October 2022, Buemi announced that he would switch to the Envision Racing team, replacing the outgoing Robin Frijns and partnering Nick Cassidy. Additionally, he ended an eight year association with e.dams, which started in his first Formula E season. Having finished sixth during the season opener in Mexico City, Buemi scored his first pole position since the 2019 New York City ePrix weekend in Diriyah, having beaten rookie Jake Hughes in the final stage of qualifying. He took points from both races in the Kingdom, ending up fourth and sixth respectively. At the Hyderabad ePrix, Buemi navigated through a chaotic race to cross the line in third position, however he would be demoted to 15th due to an overpower infringement. More misery would pile on during the opening lap of the next race in Cape Town, as the Swiss driver was hit by a late-braking Pascal Wehrlein going into Turn 10. What followed would be a recovery drive with a damaged car, in which Buemi brought his Envision back up to fifth place.

Personal life 
As of 2009, Buemi resided in Bahrain with his family and his girlfriend Jennifer. He has since moved to Monaco. He and Jennifer were married in 2015 and they have two sons together. His grandfather Georges Gachnang and his first cousin Natacha Gachnang are also racing drivers.

In 2013, Buemi and Johnny Herbert mentored 6 contestants in a primetime ITV4 reality series, with the aim of taking players of the Gran Turismo videogames to the Dubai 24 Hour race as real drivers. Other countries in Europe had heats mentored by Vitantonio Liuzzi.

Karting record

Karting career summary

Racing record

Racing career summary 

* Season still in progress.

Complete Formula BMW ADAC results
(key) (Races in bold indicate pole position, races in italics indicate fastest lap)

Complete Formula 3 Euro Series results 
(key) (Races in bold indicate pole position; races in italics indicate fastest lap)

Complete A1 Grand Prix results 
(key)

Complete GP2 Series results 
(key) (Races in italics indicate fastest lap)

Complete GP2 Asia Series results 
(key) (Races in italics indicate fastest lap)

Complete Formula One results 
(key) 

 Driver failed to finish the race, but was classified as he had completed more than 90% of the race distance.

Complete 24 Hours of Le Mans results

Complete FIA World Endurance Championship results 
(key) (Races in bold indicate pole position; races in italics indicate fastest lap)

* Season still in progress.

Complete IMSA SportsCar Championship results

Complete Formula E results 
(key) (Races in bold indicate pole position; races in italics indicate fastest lap)

† Did not finish, but was classified as he had completed more than 90% of the race distance.
* Season still in progress.

References

Career statistics from driverdb.com, retrieved June 2, 2007.
F1 Testing Report from itv-f1.com, retrieved September 19, 2007.

External links

 
 

1988 births
Living people
People from Aigle
Swiss-French people
Swiss expatriates in Bahrain
Swiss people of Italian descent
Swiss racing drivers
People of Campanian descent
People of Sicilian descent
Formula Renault 2.0 NEC drivers
Formula Renault Eurocup drivers
Formula BMW ADAC drivers
A1 Team Switzerland drivers
GP2 Asia Series drivers
GP2 Series drivers
Swiss Formula One drivers
Toro Rosso Formula One drivers
24 Hours of Le Mans drivers
24 Hours of Le Mans winning drivers
FIA World Endurance Championship drivers
Formula E drivers
Formula E Champions
Lars Kaufmann Motorsport drivers
Mücke Motorsport drivers
Racing Engineering drivers
ART Grand Prix drivers
Arden International drivers
Toyota Gazoo Racing drivers
DAMS drivers
Sportspeople from the canton of Vaud
Motopark Academy drivers
Rebellion Racing drivers
European Le Mans Series drivers
A1 Grand Prix drivers
Nismo drivers
Envision Virgin Racing drivers
Double R Racing drivers
Carlin racing drivers
Boutsen Ginion Racing drivers
Swiss expatriate sportspeople in Monaco